Igor Grosu (born 30 November 1972) is a Moldovan politician who is the President of the Parliament of the Republic of Moldova since 29 July 2021. He has been a member of the Moldovan Parliament since March 2019. Grosu has been the leader (at first acting leader) of the Party of Action and Solidarity (PAS) since 9 December 2020.

Career 
Igor Grosu became the Deputy Minister of Education of Moldova under Minister of Education was Maia Sandu. In August 2015, the Prime Minister of Moldova, Valeriu Streleț, appointed Grosu as the Prime Minister's principal consultant for Science, Education, Health Policies and Social Protection. The next Prime Minister, Gheorghe Brega, dismissed Grosu a few months after he was appointed.

When Maia Sandu founded the Action and Solidarity Party (PAS) in 2015-2016, Grosu joined as a founder-member of the party and became the party's General Secretary. In the 2019 parliamentary elections, he ran for the ACUM Platforma DA - PAS Electoral Bloc in 20th Constituency-Strășeni but was defeated by the incumbent Prime Minister, Pavel Filip. However, he was elected as deputy from the national list of the ACUM bloc, which had come in 4th place.

He also founded a few non-governmental organizations, such as: Amnesty International Moldova, National Assistance, the Non-Gov Organizations Information Center of Moldova CONTACT (Romanian: Centrul național de asistență și informare a ONG-urilor din Moldova "CONTACT"), Pro-Democracy Association (Romanian: Asociația Pro-Democrație), National Youth Council of Moldova (Romanian: Consiliul Național al Tineretului din Moldova), and the Analysis and Evaluation Center of Reform (Romanian: Centrul de analiză și evaluare a reformelor).

In December 2020, after Maia Sandu won the presidential elections and resigned her party membership, Igor Grosu became the Acting President of PAS. President Sandu appointed Grosu on 25 March 2021 to form the Government, even though she expressed her support to the dissolution of the Parliament in order to held snap parliamentary elections. After the majority of deputies in the Parliament (PSRM, ȘOR and ex-PDM factions), the proposal was automatically rejected. The Parliament was dissolved on 28 April and snap elections were held on 11 July later that year.

He ran in 2021 parliamentary elections with the first position in the national list. PAS won then the best electoral result of any right-wing party in the Moldovan history (by percentage): 52,80% of votes (63/101 MPs). On July 29, he was voted by 64 MPs the President of the Moldovan Parliament.

References 

1972 births
Living people
People from Cahul
Moldovan MPs 2019–2023
Presidents of the Moldovan Parliament